The 1911 East Wicklow by-election was held on 13 July 1911.  The by-election was held due to the resignation of the incumbent Irish Parliamentary MP, John Muldoon, in order to contest a by-election in East Cork.  It was won by the Irish Parliamentary candidate Anthony Donelan, who was unopposed.

References

1911 elections in Ireland
1911 elections in the United Kingdom
By-elections to the Parliament of the United Kingdom in County Wicklow constituencies
Unopposed by-elections to the Parliament of the United Kingdom (need citation)
July 1911 events